"Konkaroo" is a song by New Zealand band Dragon, released in April 1978. A non-album single, it was included on the group's first greatest hits, Dragon's Greatest Hits Vol. 1 in 1979. The b-side, "Mr. Thunder", appears on the group's fourth album Running Free. The single did not chart.

Track listing 
 Konkaroo (Paul Hewson) - 3:26
 Mr. Thunder (Marc Hunter) - 3:45

Charts

Personnel 
 Bass guitar, vocals – Todd Hunter
 Drums – Kerry Jacobson
 Guitar, vocals – Robert Taylor
 Keyboards, vocals – Paul Hewson
 Producer – Peter Dawkins
 Vocals – Marc Hunter

References 

1978 singles
1978 songs
Dragon (band) songs
Portrait Records singles
CBS Records singles
Song recordings produced by Peter Dawkins (musician)